Joseph Kalimbwe (born 25 March 1993) is a Zambian politician, author and activist. Previously, he was president of the African Union youth simulation in 2014 and president of the student representative council of the University of Namibia in 2017. He has written for the Namibian Sun, and has published three books including Persecuted in Search of Change in 2017, The Pain of An Empty Stomach in 2015 and Teenage-Hood & the Impact of the Western World in 2014.

Early life 
Kalimbwe was born on 25 March 1993 in Ndola, Zambia. His mother was Florence Lubinda, a primary school teacher. She was born and raised in northern Namibia at Katima Mulilo where her father worked as a social worker before moving to Zambia. His father was Donald Kalimbwe who worked between Rundu and Livingstone. His father died when he was 2 years old, and his mother died of cancer when he turned 11.

After his mother's death in 2005, Kalimbwe moved to live in with his uncle in Ndola. After high school, he attended the University of Namibia where he read political science. He obtained an honors degree in political science.

Writing in Persecuted in Search of Change he explains how he "wanted to change my surname". He writes to his late mother on the book's first page of how he is, "constantly thinking of changing my surname to yours as i see no reason of carrying a name of the man i never known and whose family I never met", in reference to his father who died when he was 2. He has also expressed his admiration to Solomon Mahlangu, John Lewis, Kenneth Kaunda, Sam Nujoma and Nelson Mandela need to change the world from its evils telling her "while I am very proud of the teachings you gave me, I am also very mindful of my own failings & hopes to find meaning in the world". In his publication with the Namibian Sun, he pointed Africa's inability to resolve poverty as a continent still "struggling to find its place in the world" saying:

Writing career 
While he served as editor of a weekly political column in the Namibian Sun, Kalimbwe began writing his first book and publish political reviews in the paper. In 2018, he began writing his fourth book, A Fractured World: How irresponsibility led to 3rd World Economic Downturns aided by former Goldman Sachs and World Bank executive Dambisa Moyo on the Worlds Economy following the 2008 financial crisis. His publications include;

Books 
 Teenage-Hood & the impact of the West – 2015
 The Pain of An Empty Stomach – 2016
 Persecuted in Search of Change – 2017

Youth participation
Kalimbwe has participated in African youth activism and was elected student representative council president of the University of Namibia. He was expelled from his Master's programme at the university in 2017 after breaking into a cafeteria with other students to use it as a study area, claiming that there were not enough designated study spaces. He also took part in the FeesMustFall protests in which university students demanded a decrease in university fees. He was later arrested as a result of this campaigning.

According to The Namibian, the student protests in Namibia are happening "against the backdrop of the Affirmative Repositioning youth movement occupying urban land, and the Landless People's Movement reclaiming ancestral land in Namibia; 'Rhodes Must Fall' and 'Fees Must Fall' protests by South African students in their quest to decolonise their universities.

During the #FeesMustFall movements in South Africa, Kalimbwe was advocating for Namibian government to scrape fees for poor students. He later was arrested in 2017 after a protest in Windhoek. His trial was postponed several times. At his 10th appearance on 30 November 2018, the state found that the trial could not continue as there was no evidence and lack of state witnesses with the state advocating for the case's removal from court roll. Later that evening, New Era (Namibia) reported that the state had lost the case against Kalimbwe whose lawyers had promised legal action against the "unfair treatment" of their client.

Controversies
In May 2017, Kalimbwe and three other members of the UNAM SRC organised a protest for increased study areas, a decrease in tuition fees, and against alleged senior staff corruption at the University of Namibia. A month before, Kalimbwe and members of the students union had claimed they had been provided with inside information of how senior staff members in the University's IT department, had allegedly taken N$1.3 million meant for a student system upgrade. The staff member, in emails leaked to The Namibian newspaper, later threatened to prevent the alleged claims by hunting down the student leaders and university employees who provided Kalimbwe with such information.

Two days after the protests, the Namibia police was called and the four student leaders where suspended and expelled for leading the protests. Kalimbwe was later charged with fraud after the university alleged he had failed to register for his master's degree programme. This increased Kalimbwe's prominence among Namibian students as student protests began in Windhoek after his followers demanded for his immediate reinstatement. Kalimbwe stated he was being removed because he refused to be used for political reasons. His third book, Persecuted in Search of Change, narrates his version of the events.

Politics

Kalimbwe joined the United Party for National Development in 2012 after high school in his hometown of Ndola. He then went to university in Namibia to study political science. He rose to attention in 2019 calling for the removal of President Edgar Lungu and asking for his replacement with his party president Hakainde Hichilema whom he helped mobilize youth support to win the 2021 election as one of the Information and Publicity Secretary in the party in rural Zambia. At the time, he claimed on local told station, Diamond Live that President Lungu and his colleagues had destroyed the "moral fibre of our politics and reduced our people into complete electoral beggers who are given money in anticipation of votes".

In August 2021, Kalimbwe told CNN and Germany TV station DW that the youth vote was central to his party's victory as "18 – 34 year olds lined up to go correct the mistakes of their parents". During the interview with DW, he stated that it was unfortunate to see "our country being ransaked by one man and his colleagues these past 7 years", in direct reference to former President Edgar Lungu.

African Youth Influence

Following his role in the election of the United Party for National Development against the ruling Patriotic front, Kalimbwe gained popularity across Africa outside his native Zambia, especially in Zimbabwe, Tanzania, Namibia and Uganda as young Africans called for the removal or oppressive ruling parties from power. In a series of tweets after the election of Hakainde Hichilema, he called on African youths to be brave if they wanted to vote out dictators saying, "Go and vote out in your masses and then protect the vote from being rigged".

A day later he posted on twitter a photo of himself with Zimbabwean opposition leader Nelson Chamisa saying "Zambia is a democracy, we welcome and debate with anyone here". After the incident, Kalimbwe was criticized on social media for taking photos with opposition political leaders from Africa after he again published photos with former Zimbabwean Finance Minister Tendai Biti, Zitto Kabwe of Tanzania and Chamisa with others claiming he was now in the ruling party and was not supposed to take photos with those in the opposition. He however rubbished the criticism claiming he will "always stand with those who supported our struggle in the opposition.

Journal commentaries

Kalimbwe became subject to public condemnations after a publication on China–Africa Relations in which he called Chinese investors "parasites feeding on African blood". Chinese Ambassador to Namibia Qiu Xuejun stated that the publication was meant to tarnish China's relationships with Africa while the United Nations High Commissioner for Refugees's Namibia coordinator and SWAPO party Namibia National Liberation Association Chairperson Nkrumah Mushelenga expressed support for Kalimbwe saying the Chinese take advantage of Africa's poverty.

References

External links
 Official Facebook

Living people
Zambian activists
People from Ndola
People from Windhoek
University of Namibia alumni
1993 births